Jeffrey Alan Hamilton (November 22, 1966 – January 10, 2023) was an American speed skier.

Career
Hamilton competed at the 1992 Winter Olympics in the speed skiing demonstration event. In this event he finished third behind the French Michael Prufer and Philippe Goitschel. In 1995, Hamilton became the first skier to go faster than 150 miles/hour (241 km/hour) and he held the world record between 1995 and 1997. He became three times world champion between 1998 and 2000, he also medalled in two other years. He also set a world record for in-line speed skating at 65 miles/hour (104.5 km/hour).

Personal life and death
Hamilton attended Placer High School in Auburn. He had a ski shop in Aspen, Colorado. 

Hamilton died in Truckee, California, on January 10, 2023, at the age of 56.

References

1966 births
2023 deaths
American male skiers
Speed skiers at the 1992 Winter Olympics
People from Auburn, California